Wedge Pass, also known as Billygoat Pass, 1430 m (4692 ft), is a mountain pass in the northern Garibaldi Ranges, the southwesternmost subdivisions of the Pacific Ranges of the Coast Mountains in British Columbia, Canada.  Located immediately on the southern flank of Wedge Mountain and to the immediate north of the Spearhead Range, site of the Blackcomb half of the Whistler Blackcomb Ski Area, it connects the head of Wedge Creek (W), a tributary of the Green River with those of Billgoat Creek (E), a tributary of the Lillooet River (as is the Green River).  The pass is within Garibaldi Provincial Park and has no road access.

See also
List of mountain passes

References

Mountain passes of British Columbia
Garibaldi Ranges
Whistler, British Columbia